In the renewable energy sector, a dunkelflaute is a period of time in which little or no energy can be generated with wind and solar power, because there is neither wind nor sunlight. In meteorology, this is known as anticyclonic gloom.

Meteorology 
Unlike a typical anticyclone, dunkelflauten are associated not with clear skies, but with very dense cloud cover (0.7–0.9), consisting of stratus, stratocumulus, and fog.  there is no agreed quantitative definition of dunkelflaute. Li et al. define it as wind and solar both below 20% of capacity during a particular 60-minute period. High albedo of low-level stratocumulus clouds in particularsometimes the cloud base height is just 400 meterscan reduce solar irradiation by half.

In the north of Europe, dunkelflauten originate from a static high-pressure system that causes an extremely weak wind combined with overcast weather with stratus or stratocumulus clouds.  There are 2–10 dunkelflaute events per year.  Most of these events occur from October to February; typically 50 to 150 hours per year, a single event usually lasts up to 24 hours.

In Japan, on the other hand, dunkelflauten are seen in summer and winter. The former is caused by stationary fronts in early summer and autumn rainy seasons (called Baiu and Akisame, respectively), while the latter is caused by arrivals of south-coast cyclones.

Renewable energy effects 
These periods are a big issue in energy infrastructure if a significant amount of electricity is generated by renewables. Dunkelflauten can occur simultaneously over a very large region, but are less correlated between geographically distant regions, so multi-national power grid  schemes can be helpful. Events that last more than two days over most of Europe happen about every five years. To ensure power during such periods flexible energy sources may be used, energy may be imported, and demand may be adjusted. 

For alternative energy sources, countries use fossil fuels (coal, oil and natural gas), hydroelectricity or nuclear power and, less often, energy storage to prevent power outages. Long-term solutions include designing electricity markets to incentivise clean flexible power. A group of countries is following on from Mission Innovation to work together to solve the problem in a clean, low-carbon way by 2030, including looking into carbon capture and storage and the hydrogen economy as possible parts of the solution.

See also 
 Duck curve
Variable renewable energy

References

Sources 
 
Electric power generation
Anticyclones